Yong-soo Choi (Hangul: 최용수, Hanja: 崔龍洙) (born August 20, 1972 in Dangjin, Chungcheongnam-do, South Korea) is a former boxer from South Korea.

In 1993, he won the Orient and Pacific Boxing Federation super featherweight title.

In 1995, Choi became the WBA super featherweight champion with a technical KO win over Victor Hugo Paz. He defended the belt seven times before losing it to Takanori Hatakeyama in 1998.

External links
 

1972 births
Super-featherweight boxers
World Boxing Association champions
World super-featherweight boxing champions
Living people
South Korean male boxers
People from Dangjin